Scea discinota is a moth of the family Notodontidae. It is known almost exclusively from localities close to the city of Mérida in Venezuela. However, there is a single record from
the State of Lara. It is engaged in mimicry with Thermidarctia thermidoides.

The length of the forewings is 23–25 mm.

Larva have been recorded on Passiflora bauhinifolia.

External links
Species page at Tree of Life project
Immature Stages Of Venezuelan Dioptinae (Notodontidae) In Josia And Thirmida

Notodontidae of South America
Moths described in 1900